The Racine Dolomite is a geologic formation in Illinois and Wisconsin. It preserves fossils dating back to the Silurian period.

See also

 Schoonmaker Reef, an exposed portion of the layer
 List of fossiliferous stratigraphic units in Illinois

References
 

Silurian Illinois
Silurian geology of Wisconsin